"California Rhinoplasty" is a song and an EP by Matmos. The song is originally found on their 2001 album A Chance to Cut Is a Chance to Cure. The recording is composed entirely from samples of plastic surgery performed in California (rhinoplasty, endoscopic forehead lift, chin implants), augmented by a nose flute.

California Rhinoplasty EP
Matmos subsequently released an EP by the same title, featuring their cover of Coil's Disco Hospital, as well as two contributed remixes of California Rhinoplasty.

Track listing
 "California Rhinoplasty" (Drew Daniel, Martin C. Schmidt) – 10:06
 "Disco Hospital" (John Balance, Peter Christopherson) – 2:28	  	
 "California Rhinoplasty (Doctor Rockit's Surgery With Complications)" (Daniel, Schmidt) – 7:58
 "California Rhinoplasty (Surgeon's Second Opinion)" (Daniel, Schmidt) – 6:43

See also
Musique concrète

References

External links
 California Rhinoplasty EP at Matmos' Discography

Electronic EPs
2001 EPs
Matmos albums